The Copa del Rey is the national ice hockey cup competition in Spain. It was first contested in 1973.

Winners

 1973: Real Sociedad
 1974: Real Sociedad
 1975: Real Sociedad
 1976: FC Barcelona
 1977: FC Barcelona
 1978: CH Casco Viejo Bilbao
 1979: CHH Txuri Urdin
 1980: CH Txuri Urdin
 1981: CH Casco Viejo Bilbao
 1982: FC Barcelona
 1983: CG Puigcerdà
 1984: CG Puigcerdà
 1985: CH Jaca
 1986: CG Puigcerdà
 1987: CG Puigcerdà (U20 tournament)
 1988: CH Jaca (U21 tournament)
 1989: CH Jaca
 1990: CHH Txuri Urdin
 1991: CHH Txuri Urdin
 1992: CG Puigcerdà
 1993: CH Jaca
 1994: CHH Txuri Urdin
 1995: CH Jaca

 1996: CH Jaca
 1997: FC Barcelona
 1998: CH Jaca
 1999: CG Puigcerdà
 2000: CHH Txuri Urdin
 2001: CH Jaca
 2002: CH Jaca
 2003: CH Jaca
 2004: CG Puigcerdà
 2005: CG Puigcerdà
 2006: CH Jaca
 2007: CG Puigcerdà
 2008: CG Puigcerdà
 2009: CG Puigcerdà
 2010: CG Puigcerdà
 2011: CH Jaca
 2012: CH Jaca
 2013: CH Jaca
 2014: Escor BAKH
 2015: FC Barcelona
 2016: Txuri Urdin
 2017: CH Jaca
 2018: Txuri Urdin

 2019: FC Barcelona
 2021: CH Jaca
 2022: CG Puigcerdà

Titles by team
 CH Jaca (15): 1985, 1989, 1993, 1995, 1996, 1998, 2001, 2002, 2003, 2006, 2011, 2012, 2013, 2017, 2021
 CG Puigcerdà (12): 1983, 1984, 1986, 1992, 1999, 2004, 2005, 2007, 2008, 2009, 2010, 2022
 CHH Txuri Urdin (8): 1979, 1980, 1990, 1991, 1994, 2000, 2016, 2018
 FC Barcelona (6): 1976, 1977, 1982, 1997, 2015, 2019
 Real Sociedad HH (3): 1973, 1974, 1975
 CH Casco Viejo Bilbao (2): 1978, 1981
 Escor BAKH (1): 2014

Junior tournaments 
 CG Puigcerdà (1): 1987 (U20 tournament)
 CH Jaca (1): 1988 (U21 tournament)

External links
 Spanish Ice Hockey Federation

Ice hockey in Spain
Spa